Sinara Yekaterinburg (Синара in Russian) is a professional futsal club based in Yekaterinburg, Russia. They had been founded in 1992. They compete in Russian futsal Superliga. Sinara are the champions of UEFA Futsal Cup in 2008.

Because of the 2022 Russian invasion of Ukraine, FIFA and Union of European Football Associations (UEFA) suspended from FIFA and UEFA competitions all Russian teams, whether national representative teams or club teams.

Current squad

Titles
 Russian champions (3): 2008/09, 2009/10, 2020/21
 UEFA Futsal Cup (1): 2008
 UEFA Futsal Cup finalists (1): 2009

References

External links

 Club Official Website
 club profile at uefa.com
 club profile at footballzz.co.uk

Futsal clubs in Russia
Sports clubs in Yekaterinburg
Futsal clubs established in 1992